The University of Science and Technology (UST) is a group of public universities and research institutions in Seoul, Suwon, Changwon, Ansan, Seongnam  and Daejeon, in South Korea. The UST was established in 2003 by the Ministry of Science, ICT and Future Planning as the nation’s graduate school specializing in science and engineering education and research. The UST runs only a graduate school. Creating the new driving force for growth would play a major role in leading national growth in the new century. The South Korean government established the UST to produce professionals in the field of combined technologies, thought of as one of the most important criteria for creating the driving force for South Korea's national growth. Today, UST continues to develop itself into a major research university.

Education advantages
UST established courses that allow students to build experience in research fields. Lab rotation is an example. UST encourage students to get hands-on experience by actively participating in the research by awarding credits as well as minimizing classroom lectures. UST provide opportunities to participate in projects conducted by other institutions or private companies. UST also adopted Lab rotation programs which enable students to gain relevant experience in various research fields. Students take liberal arts classes as prerequisite so they can be well-grounded as leaders in their given research field, and provide them with insight into society in general.

Special courses
The universities offer special courses in technical business administration, technical economics, technical strategies, theories of research, planning, and management, venture start-ups, technical communication, technical writing, etc.

UST presidents
 Chung Myung Sai (November 2003–October 2007)
 Lee Se Kyung (October 2007–October 2011)
 Lee Un Woo (December 2011–December 2015)
 Moon Kil-Choo (January 2016–January 2020)
 Kim Iee-Hwan (January 2020–current)

Majors
UST is a graduate program in science and technology taught in English run as a consortium by the advanced research institutes in Daejeon and throughout South Korea.

School of Science 
 Science of Measurement 
 Bio-molecular Science 
 Bio-Analytical Science 
 Functional Genomics 
 Nano Surface Technology 
 Green Chemistry and Environmental Biotechnology 
 Polar Science 
 Nuclear Fusion 
 Astronomy and Space Science 
 Radiological Cancer Medicine 
 Medical Physics 
 Marine Environmental System Science 
 Neuroscience 
 Technology Management and Policy

School of Engineering 
 Broadband Network Technology 
 Information Security Engineering 
 Mobile Communication & Digital Broadcasting Engineering 
 Computer Software & Engineering 
 E-BIZ Management 
 Electronic Counter Counter-Measure Communications Technology 
 ITS Engineering 
 Underwater Acoustic Communications 
 Information Network for Transportation Engineering 
 Information Science & Technology 
 Virtual Engineering 
 Grid and Supercomputing 
 HCI & Robotics 
 Geoinformatic Engineering 
 Electrical Equipment Information and Communications Engineering 
 Advanced Device Technology 
 Intelligent Robot Engineering 
 Biopotency/Toxicology Evaluation 
 Nanobiotechnology 
 Food Biotechnology 
 Korea Traditional Medicine and Biotechnology 
 Nanomaterials Science and Engineering 
 Electrical Functionality Material Engineering
 Nano-Electronics 
 Micro Nano System Engineering 
 Nano-Mechatronics 
 Accelerator and Beam Nano Engineering 
 Water Resources and Environmental Engineering 
 Resources Recycling 
 Environmental System Engineering 
 Future Modern Traffic System Engineering 
 Energy and Power Conversion Engineering 
 Advanced Energy Technology 
 Energy System Engineering 
 Green Process and System Engineering 
 Measurement and Detection of Radiation 
 Laser and Plasma Engineering 
 Advanced Nuclear System Engineering 
 Quantum Energy Chemical Engineering 
 Petroleum Resources Technology 
 Aircraft System Engineering 
 Space Launch Vehicle System Engineering 
 Accurately Guided Vehicle System Engineering 
 Satellite Systems and Applications Engineering

Campuses

UST has headquarters and following research institutions as campus.

University of Science and Technology (UST)
Korea Institute of Industrial Technology (KITECH)
Korea Institute of Science and Technology (KIST)
Electronics and Telecommunication Research Institute (ETRI)
Korea Electrotechnology Research Institute (KERI)
Korea Aerospace Research Institute (KARI)
Korea Atomic Energy Research Institute (KAERI)
Korea Basic Science Institute (KBSI)
Institute for Basic Science (IBS)
Korea Astronomy and Space Science Institute (KASI)
Korea Research Institute of Bioscience & Biotechnology (KRIBB)
Korea Institute of Oriental Medicine (KIOM)
Korea Institute of Ocean Science and Technology (KIOST)
Korea Research Institute of Chemical Technology (KRICT)
Korea Institute of Machinery & Material (KIMM)
Korea Institute of Science and Technology Information (KISTI)
Korea Research Institute of Standards and Science (KRISS)
Korea Institute of Geoscience & Mineral Resources (KIGAM)
Korea Institute of Energy Research (KIER)
Korea Institute of Nuclear Safety (KINS)
Korea Railroad Research Institute (KRRI)

Achievements and vision

Since foundation 2004, UST has been the most qualified research institution in Korea and globally as well. There were 118 Ph.D. and 321 M.S students who came from 28 countries have graduated. The number of SCI-grade theses per student until graduation is 5.44, the highest profile amongst Korean universities. In 2010, UST was followed Seoul National University as the country's second university in the number of published SCI journals (Science Citation Index).

UST is expected to be the main institution that extensively accelerates Korea's scientific research by facing the Nobel Prize Challenge.

Graduates' research achievements
 * 4.52 papers published with SCI level of journals per doctoral graduate
 1.12 case of patent applied and registered per doctoral graduate

Research projects that were selected as 100 Excellent National Research and Development Projects
 12 research projects conducted by UST faculty members and students were selected as 100 Excellent National Research and Development Projects, 2010 by the Ministry of Education, Science, and Technology.

Admission

The admissions deadline is usually around start of May and September each year. Like most of Korean universities, the students are required to first get professor approval before formally applying for the admission. The admission is quite competitive but the selective students are given opportunity to work on some of the latest R&D done in Korea and also the amount of stipend (living allowance) given to the students is much higher than KAIST, POSTECH or SNU.

See also 
 EveR-1
 List of national universities in South Korea
 List of colleges and universities in South Korea
 Education in South Korea

References

1. https://web.archive.org/web/20130903113850/http://humanoid.kist.re.kr/new/eng/index.php
2. https://web.archive.org/web/20080224052851/http://brain.kist.re.kr/korean/portal.php
3. http://www.bionano.re.kr/e_bnr/bnr01.php#1
4. http://www.yonhapnews.co.kr/bulletin/2011/05/15/0200000000AKR20110515045951017.HTML
5. http://www.etnews.com/201102160179

External links 
 Official website 

 
Universities and colleges in Daejeon
2003 establishments in South Korea
Educational institutions established in 2003